James Bolden may refer to:
 James Bolden (basketball) (born 1996), American basketball player
 James "Boogaloo" Bolden (born 1950), American musician and band leader
 James Bolden, pseudonym used by French singer David Christie (1948–1997)